Men's doubles, Women's doubles or Mixed doubles are sports having two players per side, including;
 Beach volleyball
 Doubles badminton
 Doubles curling
 Footvolley
 Doubles pickleball
 Doubles squash
 Doubles table tennis
 Doubles tennis

Doubles may also refer to:

Entertainment
 Doubles (1985 play), a Broadway production by David Wiltse
 Doubles (2000 film), a 2000 Tamil-language film
 Doubles (2011 film), a 2011 Malayalam-language film

Other
 Doubles (food), a Trinidadian sandwich
 Doubles (bells), a ringing method rung on five church bells
 A type of semi-trailer truck

See also
 Double (disambiguation)